The Gelett Burgess Children's Book Award is an annual award presented by the Gelett Burgess Center for Creative Expression. Named for Gelett Burgess, an artist and writer famous for his humorous Goops series (1900-1950), this award recognizes outstanding books that inspire imagination and creativity, and helps support childhood literacy and lifelong reading.

History
The first award was granted in 2011 when Pat Mora won Book of the Year with Gracias Thanks. In addition to the Book of the Year and several Burgess Honors, awards are granted each year in 40 categories, within 4 distinct groups: Lifestyle, Arts and Letters, Society and Culture, and Education.  The resulting list of award-winning titles is promoted throughout the year with additional activity and lesson plan resources made available.  

The Gelett Burgess Children's Book Award seal was designed by the artist himself as a child. He made an early mark on the world by carving his initials, in the form of a monogram based on the Phoenician alphabet, on nearly every church steeple in Boston. (Author's full name is Frank Gelett Burgess)

Eligibility and Criteria

 All English-language titles, North American or International may be submitted as long as the books are available to the general public (i.e., retail outlets, catalog, Amazon or manufacturer websites). Non-English language titles may be submitted to the "Foreign Language Title" category.

 Self-published and small press titles are permitted as long as they meet these guidelines.

 Books may be submitted by the publisher, author, illustrator, publicist, or anyone else working with the title.

 All items submitted for review must be of a family-friendly nature, and suitable for general audiences.

 Entries must be published during the preceding three years.

Recipients
A number of international celebrities have received the Gelett Burgess Children's Book award, including figure skater Kristi Yamaguchi, comedic actor Jim Carrey, and film director John Fusco.

See also
 Caldecott Medal
 Newbery Medal

References

External links
Official website
UC Davis, Mind Institute Article
Taylor University Article About Award Recipient

American children's literary awards

Picture book awards

Awards established in 2011